John Aldridge "Jack" Collom (November 8, 1931 – July 2, 2017) was an American poet, essayist, and creative writing pedagogue. Included among the twenty-five books he published during his lifetime were Red Car Goes By: Selected Poems 1955–2000; Poetry Everywhere: Teaching Poetry Writing in School and in the Community; and Second Nature, which won the 2013 Colorado Book Award for Poetry. In the fields of education and creative writing, he was involved in eco-literature, ecopoetics, and writing instruction for children.

Life and work
Jack Collom was born John Aldridge Collom in Chicago on November 8, 1931. He and his sister Jane Wodening grew up in the small town of Western Springs, Illinois, spent much of his time birdwatching, and over the years became an inveterate bird-watcher. Collom moved to Fraser, Colorado in 1947. He studied forestry at Colorado A&M College where he earned a B.S. in 1952. Afterwards, he spent four years in the U.S. Air Force and he started writing poetry in 1955 while stationed in Tripoli, Libya. His unit was next stationed at Neubiberg, a base just south of Munich in Bavaria. It is there he met his first wife (a native German) in 1956. Jack moved back to the US after his discharge from the military but soon returned to Germany for a brief time to get married. They naturalized back to America in 1959 where he worked in factories for twenty years while writing poetry.

Jack received his B.A. in English (1972) and M.A. in English literature (1974) from the University of Colorado where he had studied on the G.I. Bill. In 1974, he began teaching in the "Poetry-in-the-Schools" programs in Colorado, Wyoming, and Nebraska. In 1980, he began teaching poetry in the public schools of New York City, by way of the  "Poets In Public Service" and "Teachers & Writers" programs. Collom continued to teach creative writing to children for the next 35 years in both elementary and secondary schools, where he developed a pedagogy for this type of educational approach.

Subsequently, Teachers & Writers Collaborative published three books of Collom's essays and commentary on this experience (which included the young students' poems), notably Poetry Everywhere and Moving Windows.

From 1966 to 1977, he published the work of many writers in a little magazine called "The". He was twice awarded Poetry Fellowships from the National Endowment for the Arts and received a Foundation for Contemporary Arts Grants to Artists award (2012). From 1986 until his death in 2017, Collom taught at Naropa University's Jack Kerouac School of Disembodied Poetics as an adjunct professor where he shaped Writing Outreach, a community creative-writing project, into a course. In 1989 he pioneered Eco-Lit, one of the first ecology literature courses ever offered in the United States. Some of his accomplishments as an environmentalist-poet are documented in American Environmental Leaders: From Colonial Times to the Present. His nature writings and essays about the environment were published in various venues, including ecopoetics, The Alphabet of Trees: A Guide to Writing Nature Poetry, and ISLE, the journal of Interdisciplinary Studies in Literature and the Environment.

He read and taught throughout the United States, in Mexico, Costa Rica, Austria, Belgium, and Germany. In 2008, he was the plenary speaker at the "Poetic Ecologies" conference at the Université Libre de Bruxelles. In 2009, he led a three-week Creativity and Aging Program at Woodland Pattern in Milwaukee, Wisconsin.

He worked with numerous dancers, visual artists and musician/composers, and recorded three CDs: Calluses of Poetry and Colors Born of Shadow, with Ken Bernstein, and Blue Yodel Blue Heron, with Dan Hankin and Sierra Collom.

In 2001, his adopted hometown of Boulder, Colorado, declared and celebrated a "Jack Collom Day".

Personal life 

Collom was married three times. He had three sons by his first marriage. He had a daughter through a second marriage.

Jack Collom died in Boulder, Colorado on July 2, 2017.

Selected publications
Poetry
 Arguing with Something Plato Said. (Rocky Ledge Editions, 1990) 
 The Task. (Baksun Books, 1996) 
 Red Car Goes By: Selected Poems 1955–2000. (Tuumba Press, 2001) 
 Exchanges of Earth and Sky. (Fish Drum Press, 2006) 
 Situations, Sings (with Lyn Hejinian). (Adventures in Poetry, 2007) 
 Second Nature. (Boulder, Co: Instance Press, 2012) 

Nonfiction
 Poetry Everywhere: Teaching Poetry Writing in School and in the Community (with Sheryl Noethe). (Teachers & Writers Collaborative, 1994; 2nd edition, 2007) 
 (contributor) Old Faithful: 18 Writers Present Their Favorite Writing Assignments, (ed. Ron Padgett). (Teachers & Writers Collaborative, 1995; 2nd edition, 2007) 
 (editor) A Slow Flash of Light: An Anthology of Poems about Poetry. (Teachers & Writers Collaborative, 2008) 
 Moving Windows: Evaluating the Poetry Children Write. (Teachers & Writers Collaborative, 2000) 
 (contributor) The &NOW Awards 2: The Best Innovative Writing (Illinois), 2013

References

External links
 
 On Sound and Rhythm: A Way to Start Teaching Poetry to Children and Young Adults  – an excerpt from  Poetry Everywhere: Teaching Poetry Writing in School and in the Community.
 Learning the Chant Poem an excerpt from Old Faithful: 18 Writers Present Their Favorite Writing Assignments.
 The Sub-Limbo Stump-Toed Shrike & Other Dream Birds is bart plantenga's video-homage to the spirit, poetics, ornithological and yodeling energy of Jack Collom, a unique poet to say the least. 

1931 births
2017 deaths
University of Colorado alumni
Naropa University faculty
20th-century American poets
21st-century American poets
American nature writers
American conservationists
American male poets
American naturalists
American ornithologists
Environmental writers
Nature writers
Writers from Chicago
Poets from Colorado
20th-century American male writers
21st-century American male writers
20th-century American non-fiction writers
21st-century American non-fiction writers
American male non-fiction writers
Writers from Colorado